Heilongjiang is a province in northeastern China.  Its capital city, Harbin, is a "major concert center."  The city is home to a symphony orchestra, and also celebrates Harbin Summer Music Festival.

References

Heilongjiang